Laredet Begadol (Hebrew: To Get Down in Big) is a reality show broadcast on Channel 10. It is hosted by Tzipi Shavit. The show is based on "The Biggest Loser" on NBC television; program participants are overweight people looking to lose weight.

References

Channel 10 (Israeli TV channel) original programming